20 #1's Now is a 2007 compilation album by various artists and presented by reggaeton production duo Luny Tunes, released on November 20, 2007, by Machete Music.

Track list
 Welcome to My Crib – Randy "Nota Loka"
 Drop It On Me – Ricky Martin & Daddy Yankee
 Rompe – Daddy Yankee
 Noche de Entierro (Nuestro Amor) – Daddy Yankee, Hector "El Father", Zion, Wisin & Yandel, Tonny Tun Tun
 Pegao – Wisin & Yandel
 Conteo – Don Omar
 Chiquilla – Kumbia All Starz
 Maldades – Hector "El Father"
 Chica Virtual – Arcangel
 Cámara – Yomo
 Pam Pam – Wisin & Yandel
 Beautiful – Don Omar
 Te He Querido, Te He Llorado – Ivy Queen 
 Alócate – Zion & Lennox, 
 Mírame – Daddy Yankee, Deevani
 Lo Nuestro Se Fue (Cumbia Remix) – Daddy Yankee, Ivy Queen, Alex Rivera, & Wisin
 Cojela Que Va Sin Jockey – Daddy Yankee
 Es Mejor Olvidarlo – Zion & Lennox, Baby Ranks
 Royal Rumble (Se Van) – Daddy Yankee, Don Omar, Wise Da' Gangsta, Hector "El Father", Yomo, Zion, Wisin, Franco "El Gorila", Arcangel & Alexis.
 Vete – Erre XI

References 

 

 
2007 compilation albums
Luny Tunes albums
Albums produced by Luny Tunes
Mas Flow Inc. compilation albums
Machete Music compilation albums
Universal Music Group compilation albums
Reggaeton compilation albums
Spanish-language compilation albums